Emilia Patrícia Medici is a Brazilian conservation biologist who focuses on tapirs. She is the founder of the Lowland Tapir Conservation Initiative. She has published peer-reviewed research on animal movements in the Anthropocene with conservation colleagues, and found that animals move less in human-influenced habitats. Her TED Talk on tapir conservation has been viewed over 1,400,000 times.

Life 
Medici's work has included promoting putting reflective lighting on tapirs so that drivers can better see them at night.

Awards 

 Future for Nature Award
Harry Messel Conservation Leadership Award from the International Union for Conservation of Nature (2004)
Research Prize from the Durrell Institute of Conservation and Ecology (2011)
National Geographic Buffett Award for Leadership in Conservation (2019)

References

Living people
Year of birth missing (living people)
Brazilian conservationists